The Swedish Institute in Rome is a research institution that serves as the base for archaeological excavations and other scientific research in Italy. It also pursues academic instruction in archaeology and art sciences as well as arranging conferences with themes of interest to the institute. The Institute has at its disposal a building in central Rome with a relatively well-supplied library, archaeological laboratory and around twenty rooms and smaller apartments for the use of visiting researchers and holders of scholarships.

The institute was founded in 1925 by, among others, King Gustaf VI Adolf, then Crown Prince of Sweden.

Excavations
The Institute has conducted several major excavations. Before World War II, excavations were carried out on the Forum Romanum among other places, but since then most of them have taken place in southern Etruria.
 Acquarossa, 1966–1978
 San Giovenale, 1956–1965
 Luni sul Mignone, 1960–1963
 Selvasecca di Blera, 1965–1971

Directors
 Axel Boëthius (1926–35, 1952–53, 1955–57)
 Einar Gjerstad (1935–40)
 Erik Sjöqvist (1940–48)
 Arvid Andrén (1948–52, 1964–66)
 Olov Vessberg (1953–55)
 Erik Wellin (1957–61)
 Bengt E. Thomasson (1961–64)
 Paul Åström (1967–70)
 Carl Eric Östenberg (1970–78)
 Carl Nylander (1979–97)
 Anne-Marie Leander Touati (1997–2001)
 Barbro Santillo Frizell (2001–2013)
 Kristian Göransson (2013–2019)
 Ulf Hansson (2019–)

See also
 Swedish Institute

References

External links
 Official website

Educational institutions established in 1925
Research institutes in Italy
Archaeological research institutes
International research institutes
Classical educational institutes
Education in Rome
Buildings and structures in Rome
Education in Sweden
Archaeology of Italy
Science and technology in Sweden
Italy–Sweden relations
1925 establishments in Italy